Selec  is a village and municipality in Trenčín District in the Trenčín Region of north-western Slovakia.

History
The village was first mentioned in historical records of 1439. During World War II, on the December 3, 1944, German troops invaded the village and arrested 56 men from the village for help to partisans. 50 from them have been later taken to the concentration camps where 45 of them died.

Geography
The municipality lies at an altitude of 319 metres and covers an area of 24.802 km². It has a population of about 957 people. From a geomorphological point of view of the village lies in Fatra-Tatra Area in the northern part of the Považský Inovec Mts.

External links
http://www.statistics.sk/mosmis/eng/run.html

Villages and municipalities in Trenčín District